A by-election for the United Kingdom parliamentary constituency of Brent East on 18 September 2003, following the death of Labour Party MP Paul Daisley on 18 June that year. It was won by the Liberal Democrat candidate Sarah Teather.

The Liberal Democrats held on to the seat in the 2005 general election.

Result 
Turnout was 36.23%. Liberal Democrat candidate Sarah Teather won with 39.12% of the vote, which was a swing of 29% from Labour. This was the largest swing from Labour to a Liberal or Liberal Democrat candidate since the Bermondsey by-election in 1983. Commentators linked the result to anger from traditional voters over the Iraq War, as well as the private sector's involvement in public services.

There were 109 spoilt ballots.

Previous result
Labour held the seat with 63.2% of the vote at the 2001 general election. The Liberal Democrats had come third in the seat, with only 10.6% of the vote.

Aftermath 
Lib Dem leader Charles Kennedy called the result "a big boost for British politics". He said, "We have shown that there is no such thing as a no-go area for the Liberal Democrats. In Britain's most diverse community, we have shown that we can speak for every section of society and the Liberal Democrat message is one they want to hear and support."

In The Independent, psephologist John Curtice stated that "the defeat is not simply a little local difficulty. The finger of blame lies with the [Labour] party nationally. And there are two obvious candidates - Iraq and the domestic agenda." He went on to say that, due to Brent East's substantial Muslim and ethnic minority population, "the war is likely to have been especially unpopular. And there are plenty of Labour MPs whose electoral fortunes depend in part on the votes of Britain's ethnic minority communities."

Labour Party chairman Ian McCartney admitted that the invasion of Iraq had played a major role in the party's defeat. "It is the first time since 1988 that we have lost an election," he said. "It's been unprecedented in modern times, so I am very disappointed, particularly as we had an excellent candidate in Robert Evans and an excellent campaign. The backdrop of the controversy over Iraq in its many forms has caused difficulty in the by-election and generally in getting our message across about the big investment programme we have got in public services, the economy and tackling anti-social behaviour and crime."

The Conservative candidate, Uma Fernandes, was a local councillor. Her daughter Suella Fernandes, a young lawyer who was also on the list of parliamentary candidates, had to be persuaded not to seek the nomination and in the event campaigned for her mother. In 2015 Suella Fernandes she was elected for Fareham.

References

External links
British Parliamentary By Elections: Campaign literature from the by-election

See also
List of United Kingdom by-elections

2003 elections in the United Kingdom
By-elections to the Parliament of the United Kingdom in London constituencies
Elections in the London Borough of Brent
2003 in London
September 2003 events in the United Kingdom